Devotion is the fourth LP by French band Kap Bambino, released on March 16, 2012 by Because Music.

Track listing

References

2012 albums
Because Music albums
Kap Bambino albums